Carlyne Cerf de Dudzeele is a French stylist, art director and photographer.

Life and work
de Dudzeele grew up in Saint-Tropez, in the south of France, as well as in Paris, where she received a strict education and observed the mix of haute couture with everyday items that was typical of that area.  She says that her childhood came from her mother, who was "the most unimaginable woman" she ever knew.  She received "a basic and strict education [...] but intuition [was] the biggest factor". She also says that in Saint-Tropez "fashion was not a question of clothes. It was more about attitude, intelligence, the way to be, the simplicity of it. [...] [I]t was about having fun."

She moved to Paris in the 1960s and began her career interning at Depeche Mode and Marie Claire.  Later, starting in 1977, she worked at French Elle for 10 years before moving to New York in 1985 and becoming the fashion director of Vogue US, where she styled Anna Wintour's first cover in 1988, in which Israeli model Michaela Bercu was dressed in a Christian LaCroix couture top with a jeweled cross and Guess jeans. She worked closely with prominent fashion photographers of the era: Irving Penn, Richard Avedon, Helmut Newton, Paolo Roversi, Patrick Demarchelier, and her longtime collaborator, Steven Meisel.

Aside from the press industry, the stylist largely defined the Versace look in the 1990s, closely working with Gianni Versace, Azzedine Alaïa, and Karl Lagerfeld upon his arrival at Chanel.

De Dudzeele has stated she does not follow trends and says that she always creates her own fashion. To her, simplicity is what defines chic.

In October 2013, de Dudzeele was named editor at large of Lucky Magazine.

In her video series J'Adore, she says that she has loved leopard all her life and that she also loves fake fur because she prefers animals to humans. The last episode of the series was uploaded on 4 June 2014; it was cancelled because she was too busy to continue shooting videos.

References

Dudzeele
Year of birth missing (living people)
Living people